Scylla Venâncio (born 9 May 1917) is a former Olympic freestyle swimmer from Brazil, who participated at one Summer Olympics for her native country. At the 1936 Summer Olympics in Berlin, she swam the 100-metre and 400-metre freestyle, not reaching the finals.

References

External links
 

1917 births
Possibly living people
Brazilian female freestyle swimmers
Swimmers at the 1936 Summer Olympics
Olympic swimmers of Brazil